Tripolitania  (from Vulgar Latin: , from , from ), historically known as the Tripoli region, is a historic region and former province of Libya.

The region had been settled since antiquity, first coming to prominence as part of the Carthaginian empire. Following the defeat of Carthage in the Punic Wars, Ancient Rome organized the region (along with what is now modern day Tunisia and eastern Algeria), into a province known as Africa, and placed it under the administration of a proconsul. During the Diocletian reforms of the late 3rd century, all of North Africa was placed into the newly created Diocese of Africa, of which Tripolitania was a constituent province.

After the Fall of the Western Roman Empire in the 5th century, Tripolitania changed hands between the Vandals and the Byzantine Empire, until it was taken during the Muslim conquest of the Maghreb in the 8th century. It was part of the region known to the Islamic world as Ifriqiya, whose boundaries roughly mirrored those of the old Roman province of Africa Proconsularis. Though nominally under the suzerainty of the Abbasid Caliphate, local dynasties such as the Aghlabids and later the Fatimid Caliphate were practically independent. The native Berbers, who had inhabited the area locally for centuries before the arrival of the Arabs, established their own native Hafsid dynasty over Ifriqiya in the 13th century, and would control the region until it was conquered by the Ottoman Empire in the 15th century, who established Ottoman Tripolitania as a distinct province. Tripolitania became an Italian colony in 1911. 

After the 1934 formation of Libya, the Tripolitania province was designated as one of the three primary provinces of the country, alongside Cyrenaica province to the east and Fezzan province to the south.

Definition 

Historically, the name Tripoli designated a region rather than a city, just as today in Arabic the same word Tarablus (طرابلس) is used for both the city and the region. The Arabic word used alone would be understood to mean only the city; in order to designate Tripolitania in Arabic, a qualifier such as "state", "province" or "sha'biyah" is required.

The region of Tripoli or Tripolitania derives from the Greek name  "three cities", referring to Oea, Sabratha and Leptis Magna. Oea was the only one of the three cities to survive antiquity, and became known as Tripoli. Today Tripoli is the capital city of Libya and the northwestern portion of the country.

In addition to Tripoli, the following are among the largest and most important cities of Tripolitania: Misrata, Zawiya (near ancient Sabratha), Gharyan, Khoms (near ancient Leptis Magna), Tarhuna and Sirte.

History

Antiquity

The city of Oea, on the site of modern Tripoli, was founded by the Phoenicians in the 7th century BC. It was conquered for a short  time by the Greek colonists of Cyrenaica, who were in turn displaced by the Punics of Carthage. The Roman Republic captured Tripolitania in 146 BC, and the area prospered during the Roman Empire period. The Latin name Regio Tripolitania dates to the 3rd century. The Vandals took over in 435, and were in turn supplanted by the counter offensive of the Byzantine Empire in the 530s, under the leadership of emperor Justinian the Great and his general Belisarius.

Middle Ages

In the 7th century, Tripolitania was conquered by the Rashidun Caliphate, and was inherited by its descendants, the Umayyad Caliphate and the Abbasid Caliphate. The Fatimid Caliphate ruled from Tunisia to Syria. In the 1140s, the Italo-Normans invaded Tripoli, but were ousted by the Almohad Caliphate in 1158. Abu Zakariya Yahya, an Almohad vassal, established an independent state in Tunisia in 1229 and took control of Tripolitania shortly after. The Hafsids would control the region until the Ottoman conquest of 1553.

Modern history

Ottoman Tripolitania extended beyond the region of Tripolitania proper, also including Cyrenaica. Tripolitania became effectively independent under the rulers of the Karamanli dynasty from 1711 until Ottoman control was re-imposed by Mahmud II in 1835. Ottoman rule persisted until 1911–12, when it was captured by Italy in the Italo-Turkish War. Italy officially granted autonomy after the war, but gradually occupied the region.

After World War I, an Arab Republic, Al-Jumhuriya al-Trabulsiya, or "Tripolitanian Republic", declared the independence of Tripolitania from Italian Libya. The proclamation of the Tripolitanian Republic in autumn 1918 was followed by a formal declaration of independence at the 1919 Paris Peace Conference (Treaty of Versailles). This was the first formally declared republican form of government in the Arab world, but it gained little support from international powers, and disintegrated by 1923. Italy under Fascist dictator Benito Mussolini managed to reestablish full control over Libya by 1930.

Originally administered as part of a single colony, Italian Tripolitania was a separate colony from 26 June 1927 to 3 December 1934, when it was merged into Libya. The Italian fascists constructed the Marble Arch as a form of an imperial triumphal arch at the border between Tripolitani and Cyrenaica near the coast.

Tripolitania experienced a huge development in the late 1930s, when was created the Italian 4th shore with the Province of Tripoli and with Tripoli as a modern "westernized" city. The Tripoli Province ("Provincia di Tripoli" in Italian) was established in 1937, with the official name: Commissariato Generale Provinciale di Tripoli. It was considered a province of the Kingdom of Italy and lasted until 1943.

During World War II, several see-saw back and forth campaigns with mobile armour vehicles ebbed and flowed across the North African coastal deserts between first Italian Fascists and the British, soon joined by the Nazi Germans in 1941. Libya was finally occupied by the western Allies, the British moving west from Egypt after their victory at El Alamein in October 1942 against German Field Marshall Erwin Rommel and his Afrika Korps, and the Americans from the west after landings in Operation Torch in Morocco and Algeria in November 1942. From 1942 continuing to the end of the war in 1945 until 1951, when Libya gained independence, Tripolitania and the region of Cyrenaica were administered by the British Military Administration. Italy formally renounced its claim upon the territory in 1947.

Tripolitania retained its status as a province in the Kingdom of Libya from 1951 to 1963, when it was replaced by a new system of governorates, which divided Tripolitania into the governorates of Khoms, Zawiya, Jabal al Gharbi, Misrata, and Tarabulus.

Modern Latin missionary jurisdiction: Apostolic Vicariate of Tripolitana (later renamed after its see, Benghazi).

Notes

References

External links 

Brief history of Tripolitania
Map of Tripolitania showing its important cities and towns.